Chłopówko may refer to the following places in West Pomeranian Voivodeship, Poland:

Chłopówko, Myślibórz County
Chłopówko, Szczecinek County